Ranveer Singh is an Indian actor who appears in Hindi films. Singh is the recipient of 42 awards to his credit including five Filmfare Awards: Best Male Debut for Band Baaja Baaraat (2010), Best Actor for Bajirao Mastani (2015),  Gully Boy (2019) and 83 (2021), and won the Filmfare Award for Best Actor (Critics) for Padmaavat (2019). He has also received Best Actor nominations at the ceremony for Goliyon Ki Raasleela Ram-Leela (2013) and Padmaavat.

Filmfare Awards
The Filmfare Awards is one of the oldest and most prominent Hindi film award ceremonies. They are presented annually by The Times Group to honour both artistic and technical excellence.

International Indian Film Academy Awards
The International Indian Film Academy Awards (IIFA Awards) are organised by Wizcraft International Entertainment Pvt. Ltd. to honour members of the Bollywood film industry.

Star Screen Awards
The Star Screen Awards is a yearly ceremony honouring professional excellence in the Hindi language film industry.

Stardust Awards
The Stardust Awards are presented by Stardust magazine. They honour professional excellence in the Hindi film industry.

Zee Cine Awards
The Zee Cine Awards are presented by Zee Entertainment Enterprises for the Hindi film industry. The awards were inaugurated in 1998 and are a mixture of categories decided on by public votes and by an industry jury. The awards were not presented in 2009 and 2010, but were resumed from 2011.

BIG Star Entertainment Awards  
The BIG Star Entertainment Awards is an annual event organised by the Reliance Broadcast Network.

Producers Guild Film Awards
The Producers Guild Film Awards (previously known as the Apsara Film & Television Producers Guild Awards) are presented by the Producers Guild to honour and recognise the professional excellence of their peers.

ETC Bollywood Business Awards
The ETC Bollywood Business Awards are presented annually by ETC Bollywood Business to award Bollywood films. This is the only award in India which judges films based on their box-office performances.

Times of India Film Awards

Other awards and recognition

Notes

See also
 List of accolades received by Bajirao Mastani
 List of accolades received by Dil Dhadakne Do
 List of accolades received by Padmaavat

References

External links
 

Lists of awards received by Indian actor